Where's Wally?/Waldo: The Magnificent Poster Book! was a Where's Wally? poster book released in 1991. The book introduces Wenda and Odlaw. Characters to spot include Wally, Woof, Wilma, Wenda, Wizard Whitebeard, Odlaw, and the Wally Watchers. The book included large one-sided posters of Wally scenes. Of the 11 scenes, five were from past Wally books and 6 were all-new (although three of them would later be published in Where's Waldo?: The Great Picture Hunt).

The book marks the second and last time Wilma was seen.

In 2010, another large poster book was published titled The Spectacular Poster Book.

Scenes
 The Monstrous Monsters
 The Castle Siege 
On the Beach
 Military Parade 
 The Nasty Nasties
 Land of Sports
 Unfriendly Giants
 Among the Pirates
 The Future
 The Land of Wallies
 The Old Friends

Notes

British picture books
Puzzle books
Where's Wally? books
Little, Brown and Company books
1991 children's books
British children's books